The Battle of Vuosalmi (also known as the Battle of Äyräpää-Vuosalmi) – the main bulk of it – lasted from July 4 to July 17, 1944.  It was fought during the Continuation War (1941–1944), a part of World War II, between Finland and the Soviet Union.

Background 
After the Soviets saw that they had failed in the Battle of Tali-Ihantala against the Finnish defenders in the late June and early July 1944, they tried to break the Finnish positions in Vuosalmi (now Druzhnoye) and encircle the southern part of the Finnish forces in the Karelian Isthmus. Soviet forces of the 23rd Army in the region had made unsuccessful low-scale attacks against the Finnish defenses for nearly two weeks at Äyräpää region. Lack of success from the 23rd Army's performance lead to change of command on July 3.

Order of battle

Finnish
Finnish defenses on the Vuosalmi consisted initially of only the 2nd Division (Martola, later Blick). But this was later reinforced with parts of the Armored Division (Lagus), 57th Infantry Regiment and 25th Separate Battalion of the 15th Infantry Division and 4th Battalion of the 19th Brigade (IV/19.Pr) after the battles in the Tali-Ihantala region started to slow down. A total of 21 artillery battalions were supporting infantry during the critical last stage of the battle. Per infantry battalion there were more artillery support at Vuosalmi than at Tali-Ihantala.

III Corps (Siilasvuo)
2nd Infantry Division (Martola/Blick)
15th Infantry Division (Hersalo)
57th Infantry Regiment
25th Separate Battalion
19th Infantry Brigade (Maskula)
4th Battalion of brigade(during last stage)

Finnish Armoured Division (Lagus, during last stage)
Assault Gun Battalion
4 Jäger Battalions

Total forces initially ~20,000 growing to ~32,000 in mid july. Average personal strength of infantry division around 13,300 men, while 6,700-7,000 of infantry brigade, 3,620 of infantry regiment and 1,022 of infantry battalion. 21 field artillery battalions (average 520-560 men each).

Soviet
The Soviet Leningrad Front's 23rd Army (Svetsov) was assigned with the task of making a crossing and a breakthrough at Vuosalmi. For this task the 23rd Army assigned first the 98th Rifle Corps and later switched it to the 115th Rifle Corps.

98th Rifle Corps (Anisimov)
92nd Rifle Division
281st Rifle Division
381st Rifle Division

115th Rifle Corps (Kozatsek)
10th Rifle Division
92nd Rifle Division
142nd Rifle Division

6th Rifle Corps
13th Rifle Division
382th Rifle Division
327th Rifle Division (Soviet Union)

Supporting units of 23rd Army

17th Fortification Area troops
47th Guards Artillery Brigade
21st, 151st and 336th Artillery Regiments
165th, 641st, 883rd and 1072nd Antitank Regiments
175th, 456th, 506th and 567th Mortar Regiments
70th Guards Mortar Regiment
1469th Antiaircraft Regiment
71st and 618th Separate Antiaircraft Battallions

46th Guards Tank Regiment
226th Tank Regiment
938th Self-Propelled Gun Regiment
952rd Self-Propelled Gun Regiment

71st Separate Armoured Train Battalion
20th Engineer Brigade

Total: 8 infantry divisions, 80-90 tanks or assault/self-propelled guns and around 600 field artillery pieces or heavy mortars. Average personal strength of rifle divisions was around 6,600-6,700 men.

The battle 
The Finnish positions were very unfavorably located on the ridge of Äyräpää, with the wide River Vuoksi behind it. Though the position was very unfavorable, the Äyräpää ridge dominated the lower terrain on the northern shore requiring the defensive lines to be placed on the ridge. The Red Army 98th Corps started heavier attacks on July 4 and heavy battles raged for control of the ridge until July 9 when the  Finns finally withdrew to the northern shore. The Soviet 115th Corps then continued the attack and crossed the Vuosalmi on July 9. During that day both Soviet and Finnish forces had their highest numbers of artillery and mortar rounds fired: 30,000 (Soviet forces) and 18,800 (Finnish, 13,500 of which were field artillery rounds).

The Soviet 115th Corps reinforced the bridgehead and had all its three divisions in the bridgehead on July 11. The Finnish forces also received reinforcements in the form of the depleted Finnish Armored Division directly from the Ihantala and on July 11 both sides were attempting to attack simultaneously. Attempts on both sides were halted when they ran into attacking enemy formations. Though the Soviets now had access to the open fields on the northern shore, which were advantageous to the Soviet armor, the Finns were able to stop all further Soviet advances. The following Finnish counterattacks in Vuosalmi at this point amounted to not much success either, and thus both sides were on the defensive here in mid-July, 1944.

The Finnish field artillery fired altogether over 122,000 rounds of ordnance in Äyräpää and Vuosalmi, from June 20 to July 17, 1944 – the same amount as in the Battle of Tali-Ihantala, which was fought during exactly the same time period in a nearby vicinity, on the relatively narrow Karelian Isthmus of Finland. Mortar units fired 85,000 rounds. When comparing the 8 day period of the most intensive fighting many more artillery rounds were fired in Vuosalmi (74,000) than in Tali-Ihantala (56,000). During that 8 day period in Vuosalmi Finnish mortar units fired also 52,000 rounds.

 Finnish field artillery especially during the latter part of battle fired relatively heavy rounds. On 16 July the average weight of rounds were around 28 kilos.

Aftermath 
The commander of the Soviet Leningrad Front, Marshal Leonid Govorov heavily criticized  the 23rd Army, 98th Corps and 115th Corps commanders when the offensive in Vuosalmi failed to yield any concrete results despite of the heavy casualties sustained.

Gallery

References

Sources
 
 

Vuosalmi
1944 in Finland
Finland in World War II
July 1944 events
Karelo-Finnish Soviet Socialist Republic